The Lyon Metro is a rapid transit system serving Lyon Metropolis, France. First opened in 1974, it currently consists of four lines, serving 40 stations and comprising  of route. Part of the Transports en Commun Lyonnais (TCL) system of public transport, it is supported by two funiculars and a tramway network.

Unlike other French metro systems, but like RER and other SNCF services, Lyon Metro trains run on the left. This is the result of an unrealised project to run the metro into the suburbs on existing railway lines. The Lyon Metro has rubber-wheel cars. Daily weekday ridership was 740,000 in 2011.

Routes
The Lyon Metro consists of four lines, A, B, C and D, each identified on maps by different colours:

Lines A and B 

Line A from Perrache to Laurent Bonnevay (Astroballe) and Line B from Charpennes to Part-Dieu were constructed by cut-and-cover and went into service on 2 May 1978, as the inaugural lines of the Lyon Metro. Trains on both lines run on rubber tyres rather than steel wheels.

Line B was extended to Jean Macé on 9 September 1981, to Gerland on 4 September 2000 as well as later to Gare d'Oullins on 11 December 2013.

An extension to Vaulx-en-Velin La Soie on Line A opened in October 2007.

By 2020, Line B will be automated, with the same system as Line D. New MPL 16 rolling stock has been ordered to Alstom in 2016 for Line B. The MPL 75 trains currently used on Line B will join the other MPL 75s on Line A to increase capacity.

Line C 

The Croix-Rousse-Croix-Paquet rack railway, which was refurbished in 1974, was integrated into the Metro in 1978 as Line C, with an extension to Hôtel-de-Ville (thus running from Hôtel-de-Ville to Croix-Rousse). It was extended to Cuire on 8 December 1984.

The line was constructed using various methods; the incline rising through a deep tunnel, the portion on the flat at Croix-Rousse using cut-and-cover while the section beyond Hénon runs on the surface. The Croix Paquet station claims to be the steepest metro station in Europe, with an incline of 17%.

Line C uses an overhead wire while Lines A, B and D use a third rail.

Line D 

Line D, the first fully automatic metro line in France, started with operators on board trains on 4 September 1991, between Gorge de Loup and Grange Blanche. The line was extended to Gare de Vénissieux on 11 December 1992, when it switched to driverless operation. On 28 April 1997, it was extended again to Gare de Vaise.

Using rubber tyres like lines A and B, trains on line D are controlled by a system known as MAGGALY (Métro Automatique à Grand Gabarit de l’Agglomération Lyonnaise). Unusually for a driverless metro, no platform screen doors are installed on station platforms. The trains use infrared sensors to detect obstructions on the track. Other systems using this technology include the Nuremberg U-Bahn and Budapest Metro's Line 4.

The deepest line in Lyon, Line D was constructed partly using boring machines and passes under both rivers, the Rhône and Saône.

In 2016, new MPL 16 rolling stock was ordered from Alstom for Line B and Line D; it came into service on Line B in 2022. These trains allow for an increase in capacity on Line D. Further, they will be coupled to form four-car units at rush hours and should replace the MPL 75 of Line B which would then solely run on Line A.

Map

Operation 

Future expansion 
Work is under way to extend Line B to a new terminus at Lyon's southern hospital complex in Saint-Genis-Laval. The extension is due to enter service in 2023. New rolling stock, capable of operating as a single two-car trainset or two coupled trainsets for four-car operation, will be introduced and the line will be automated. Existing rolling stock used on Line B will be used to enhance capacity on Line A. Line D will also receive 10 new trainsets and its automatic control system will be upgraded.

A new line, dubbed Line E, is under consideration to link Lyon's western suburbs to the city centre. Twelve variants were initially proposed; two options, running from either Bellecour or Hôtel de Ville to Alaï, have been selected for further study and could potentially be opened by around 2030.

In 2022 however the plans for Line E and other metro extensions have been cancelled in favor of plans for new express tramways, partly underground.

See also 
 List of Lyon Metro stations
 List of metro systems

References

External links 

 Lyon Metro Map on Google Maps with Geolocation
  
 Lyon at UrbanRail.net 
 Comprehensive map of the Lyon metro network 
 Métro de Lyon  – French Wikipedia has a much more detailed description of the Lyon Metro